The Borsuk problem in geometry, for historical reasons incorrectly called Borsuk's conjecture, is a question in discrete geometry. It is named after Karol Borsuk.

Problem
In 1932, Karol Borsuk showed that an ordinary 3-dimensional ball in Euclidean space can be easily dissected into 4 solids, each of which has a smaller diameter than the ball, and generally n-dimensional ball can be covered with  compact sets of diameters smaller than the ball. At the same time he proved that n subsets are not enough in general. The proof is based on the Borsuk–Ulam theorem. That led Borsuk to a general question:

 Die folgende Frage bleibt offen: Lässt sich jede beschränkte Teilmenge E des Raumes  in (n + 1) Mengen zerlegen, von denen jede einen kleineren Durchmesser als E hat?

This can be translated as:

 The following question remains open: Can every bounded subset E of the space  be partitioned into (n + 1) sets, each of which has a smaller diameter than E?

The question was answered in the positive in the following cases:
 n = 2 — which is the original result by Karol Borsuk (1932).  
 n = 3 — shown by Julian Perkal (1947), and independently, 8 years later, by H. G. Eggleston (1955). A simple proof was found later by Branko Grünbaum and Aladár Heppes. 
 For all n for smooth convex bodies — shown by Hugo Hadwiger (1946).
 For all n for centrally-symmetric bodies — shown by A.S. Riesling (1971).
 For all n for bodies of revolution — shown by Boris Dekster (1995).

The problem was finally solved in 1993 by Jeff Kahn and Gil Kalai, who showed that the general answer to Borsuk's question is no. However, as pointed out by Bernulf Weißbach, the first part of this claim is in fact false. But after improving a suboptimal conclusion within the corresponding derivation, one can indeed verify one of the constructed point sets as a counterexample for n = 1325 (as well as all higher dimensions up to 1560).

In 2013, Andriy V. Bondarenko had shown that Borsuk’s conjecture is false for all . Shortly after, Thomas Jenrich derived a 64-dimensional counterexample from Bondarenko's construction, giving the best bound up to now.

Apart from finding the minimum number n of dimensions such that the number of pieces , mathematicians are interested in finding the general behavior of the function . Kahn and Kalai show that in general (that is, for n sufficiently large), one needs  many pieces. They also quote the upper bound by Oded Schramm, who showed that for every ε, if n is sufficiently large, . The correct order of magnitude of α(n) is still unknown. However, it is conjectured that there is a constant  such that  for all .

See also
Hadwiger's conjecture on covering convex bodies with smaller copies of themselves
 Kahn–Kalai conjecture

Note

References

Further reading
 Oleg Pikhurko, Algebraic Methods in Combinatorics, course notes.
 Andrei M. Raigorodskii, The Borsuk partition problem: the seventieth anniversary, Mathematical Intelligencer 26 (2004), no. 3, 4–12.

External links
 

Disproved conjectures
Discrete geometry